The 1952 Washington and Lee Generals football team was an American football team that represented Washington and Lee University during the 1952 college football season as a member of the Southern Conference. In their first year under head coach Carl Wise, the team compiled an overall record of 3–7, with a mark of 3–4 in conference play.

Schedule

References

Washington and Lee
Washington and Lee Generals football seasons
Washington and Lee Generals football